Anthony Maria Zaccaria, CRSP (Italian: Antonio Maria Zaccaria; 1502 – 5 July 1539) was an early leader of the Counter Reformation, the founder of religious orders (Barnabites) and a promoter of the devotion to the Passion of Christ, the Eucharist and the renewal of the religious life among the laity. He is venerated as a saint in the Catholic Church, which celebrates his feast day on 5 July.

Life
Anthony Zaccaria was born in the city of Cremona, Italy, in December 1502 to Lazzaro and Antonia Pescaroli Zaccaria. He was baptized the same day in Cremona Cathedral, probably by his uncle Don Tommaso Zaccaria, canon of the cathedral. When he was two, his father died. His family was of the nobility, and in order to teach him compassion for the poor, his mother made him her almoner. 

After attending the Episcopal School annexed to the cathedral, he studied philosophy at the University of Pavia, and, from 1520, medicine at the University of Padua. After completing studies in 1524, he returned to Cremona and practised as a physician for three years. In 1527, he started studying for the priesthood, and continued his theological studies in Bologna.

On February 20, 1529 Zaccaria was ordained a priest in the Chapel of Saint Joseph in Cremona Cathedral. Having explored his calling, mainly by working in hospitals and institutions for the poor, he became spiritual advisor to Countess Ludovica Torelli of Guastalla (then the tiny County of Guastalla), and in 1530 followed her to Milan. There, he became a member of the Oratory of Eternal Wisdom, where he met Bartolomeo Ferrari and Giacomo Antonio Morigia.

Their devotions mainly focused on the teachings of Paul of Tarsus with emphasis on love for the Eucharist and Christ crucified. They were soon joined by others. They instructed in the rudiments of their faith, gave missions in parishes in the city and elsewhere, and cared for the sick in the hospitals. Zaccaria was occupied with preaching in churches and on street corners. In August 1531 he  (Milan). Zaccaria revived the custom of ringing church bells at 3 p.m. on Fridays, in remembrance of the passion and death of Jesus. There activities aroused some opposition, but the group persevered. 

In 1533, having received encouragement from Pope Clement VII, Zaccaria took a small house near the church of St. Catherine at the Ponte dei Fabbri, and here they began their community life. The congregation was named after the companion of Paul. In 1534 at St. Catherine's, he popularized the Forty-hour devotion for the laity – the solemn exposition of the Blessed Sacrament for adoration by the faithful – accompanied by preaching. In July 1535 Pope Paul III, with a Bull of approbation, confirms the devotion to Saint Paul for Zaccaria and his group.

While on mission to Guastalla in 1539, he caught a fever. Combined with the strict penances he performed, his health worsened and he died on 5 July 1539, at the age of 36. The suffragan bishop, Luca di Seriate, who had ordained him a priest, presided over his funeral. In attendance were the aristocrats and people of Cremona and the surrounding towns. He was buried in the San Paolo Convent of the Angelics of Saint Paul, the female branch of the Barnabites, in Milan. In his last will and testament, Zaccaria stipulated the construction of a chapel in honor of the Conversion of Saint Paul in his parish, Saint Donato.

Foundations
While in Milan, he laid the foundations of three religious institutes: one for men (the Clerics Regular of Saint Paul, commonly known as the Barnabites); a female branch of uncloistered nuns, the Angelic Sisters of St. Paul; and a lay congregation for married people, the Laity of Saint Paul, originally called the Married of Saint Paul (sometimes  called the Oblates of Saint Paul in North America). The three foundations met regularly, and engaged together in various forms of apostolic action. Their aim was the reform of decadent society, beginning with the clergy and religious.

The Clerics Regular of St. Paul (the Barnabites)
"The Congregation of the Regular Clerks of St. Paul" was canonically sanctioned by Pope Clement VII in 1533. Since the order criticized what they saw as abuses in the Church, Zaccaria soon gained a number of enemies, and as the order's founder, he was twice investigated for heresy, in 1534 and 1537. He was acquitted both times. In 1536, he stepped down as General of the Order and went to Vicenza, where he reformed two convents and founded the Order's second house.

The Angelic Sisters of St. Paul
On January 15, 1535 Pope Paul III approved the Angelic Sisters with the Bull, Debitum pastoralis officii. On February 27, 1536 Zaccaria conferred the habit on six postulants of the Angelic Sisters. Zaccaria appointed Paola Antonia Negri as Mistress of Novices on March 4, 1537.

Veneration
After his death, a number of cures were attributed to the intercession of Anthony Mary Zaccaria. 27 years after his death, his body was found to be incorrupt. His mortal remains are now enshrined at the Church of Saint Barnabas in Milan, Italy. He was canonized by Pope Leo XIII on 27 May 1897. His feast day is celebrated on 5 July, and he is a patron saint of physicians.

Iconography
In art, he is depicted wearing the black cassock of the Order and holding a lily, cross, chalice and/or a host.

Chronology of the Life of  St. Anthony Mary Zaccaria

 December 25, 1535 (Milan). On Christmas Day, Anthony Mary Zaccaria celebrates Mass for the first time at the Oratory of the Monastery of Saint Paul of the Angelic Sisters.
 January 25, 1536 (Milan). Zaccaria officially inaugurates the new Monastery of Saint Paul.
 April 15, 1536 (Milan). Giacomo Antonio Morigia is elected Superior.
 May 7, 1536 (Milan). Zaccaria promotes the exposition of the Holy Shroud from the balcony of Castello Sforzesco for the first time in history.
 November 30, 1536 (Milan). Zaccaria proposes to Fr. Francis Castellino to establish permanently the School of Christian Doctrine for the youth.
 April 19, 1537 (Guastalla). With a handwritten letter undersigned by Torelli, Zaccaria appoints Giuseppe Fellini of Cremona, Podestà (Mayor) of Guastalla.
 July 2, 1537 (Milan). On Tuesday, Zaccaria accompanies the first Pauline missionaries (Barnabites, Angelic Sisters, and Laity of St. Paul) and some collaborators (Castellino da Castello and Fra Bono Lizzari) to Vicenza, and builds an altar in honor of Saint Paul in the Church of the Converted.
 August 21, 1537 (Milan). The Senate President, Giacomo Filippo Sacchi, issues a full acquittal ex capite innocentiae on all the charges of heresy leveled against the Paulines.
 Year 1537 (Milan). Zaccaria promotes the solemn Forty Hours Adoration of the Blessed Sacrament in the Cathedral of Milan, and in shifts at the Quattro Porte ("Four Gates") of the city. 
 August 29, 1537 (Milan). At the request of the Milanese, Pope Paul III issues the Papal brief Universis Christifidelibus, addressed to the Vicar-General, Cardinal Marino Caracciolo, approving and supporting the Forty Hours devotion.
 November 13, 1538 (Guastalla). Zaccaria asks and obtains justice, with the intervention of the Podestà (Mayor), for Giandomenico Mangalassi, a victim of injustice.
 June 20, 1539 (Guastalla). Zaccaria writes to the couple Omodei in Milan and speaks of a great "weariness of the body." He feels that his end is imminent and wants to be brought back to Cremona through a boat of dealers who have two mandatory stops (in Cremona and Casalmaggiore) of their trade route along the Po River.
 July 5, 1539 (Cremona). On Saturday, at 3 o’clock in the afternoon, the eve of the Octave Day of Saints Peter and Paul the Apostles, Anthony Mary Zaccaria dies in the house where he was born, in the arms of his mother and surrounded by his first companions.

Writings 
He's left only a few writings: twelve letters, six sermons, and the constitution of the Barnabites.

Letters 

There are eleven letters signed by Anthony Mary. Four are original manuscripts: Letter II (addressed to Bartolomeo Ferrari and Giacomo Antonio Morigia, January 4, 1531); Letter IV (to Giovan Giacomo Piccinini, January 16, 1534); Letter VI (to Ferrari, October 8, 1538); and Letter VII (to Battista Soresina, November 3, 1538). Of the other seven, we have only copies, though they are very early. Three letters are cosigned by Anthony Mary and Angelic Paola Antonia Negri. They are, Letter VI, Letter VII], and Letter VIII. In addition, there is a twelfth letter: though it bears only Negri's signature, it was without a doubt penned by Anthony Mary. In fact, the original manuscript of this letter is in Anthony Mary's own handwriting. 
 
One letter is addressed to Fra Battista da Crema (Letter I); two are addressed to the Angelics (Letter V and Letter IX); three to laymen (Letter III, Letter IV, and Letter XI); and four to the Barnabites (Letter II, Letter VII, Letter VIII, and Letter X). One (Letter VI) is addressed to Bartolomeo Ferrari, but it is meant for both Barnabites and Angelics who were doing missionary work in Vicenza.
 
The eleven letters cover a nine-year period, 1530 to 1539. However, there are gaps between 1531 and 1534, and between 1534 and 1537. Letter IX and Letter XII are undated. The last three letters, a remarkable total of 2,200 words penned in the brief space of ten busy days, were addressed to an Angelic, a Barnabite, and a Married Couple. Written respectively on June 10, 11, and 20, 1539, that is, within less than a month of his death, these letters unwittingly became, as it were, his final testament to the three families of his foundation. Anthony Mary's letters do not belong to any literary genre nor can they be styled “spiritual letters” per se. They were occasional writings dashed off without any concern for style, in plain, totally unadorned language. However, they do contain a wealth of extraordinary spirituality, a fact easily recognized by his earliest biographers.
 
Anthony Mary himself, in his last letter, pointedly remarked: “I have not written one word without some special meaning in it. If you discover it, it will be, I think, most useful and gainful for you.”

The 12 Letters of St. Anthony Mary Zaccaria 
 Letter  1 - Being Thankful to God
 Letter  2 - Remedies for Irresoluteness
 Letter  3 - Unceasing Prayer
 Letter  4 - Confidence in God in the Face of Difficulty
 Letter  5 - Spiritual Renewal and Progress
 Letter  6 - Spiritual Progress & Christian Service
 Letter  7 - Christ’s Will Versus One’s Own Will
 Letter  8 - Trust in the Lord
 Letter  9 - The Saints, True Imitators of Christ
 Letter 10 - Steady Growth in Holiness
 Letter 11 - Becoming Great Saints
 Letter 12 - God’s Gift of Light

LISTEN FREE TO THE 12 LETTERS OF ST. ANTHONY MARY

Sermons 

The manuscript codex of the Sermons is kept in the General Archives of the Barnabites in Rome. It was entrusted by Anthony Mary's mother to the Angelics of Santa Marta Convent in Cremona. Early Barnabite historian, Father Giovanni Antonio Gabuzio, retrieved it during his stay in that city from 1584 to 1595. It is an index-notebook. When he was a student at the University of Padua, Anthony Mary recorded in it some lines of the philosopher, Averroës. Later on, as a priest in Cremona, he wrote in it the talks on the Ten Commandments, which he gave at the Amicizia Oratory in Saint Vitalis Church. Clearly, he planned to write out ten sermons, one on each commandment. However, the notebook contains only five sermons: four on the first four commandments. The fifth one is on the commandment, but is only half finished. Sermon I has an appendix on how nuns should practice the first commandment. It was likely intended for the Augustinian Community of Santa Maria Annunziata in Cremona.
 
A sixth sermon was part of a projected trilogy on moral and spiritual lukewarmness. The Sermons are addressed to noble laymen, who were married and had children, and were active members of the Amicizia Oratory, in the years 1529-1530 when Anthony Mary was a priest; however, their content is applicable to everyone. The above-mentioned appendix to Sermon I proves it. All the Sermons have the same structure. They are divided in two parts. The first one treats of a specific theme. In Sermon I it is the “due order” of the spiritual life; in Sermon II, “true spiritual life”; in Sermon III, “acknowledgment”; in Sermon IV, love; in Sermon V, passions; in Sermon VI, the “way of God.” The second part of Sermons 1–V is an extensive exposition of each commandment and its practice. In the case of Sermon VI, the second part is a detailed explanation of lukewarmness. 
 
The Sermons exhibit a more elaborate style than that of the Letters. The language, though direct, reveals greater care and elegance. The reasoning is cogently logical and is structured on solid theological preparation. The numerous Biblical quotations reveal a mastery of the Scriptures.
 
Recently, a hypothesis was put forth, saying the Sermons are not liturgical homilies but opening talks given at the Amicizia Oratory meetings, where all present could then speak. It is noteworthy that Anthony Mary reserves the term “sermon” only for his talk on lukewarmness.

List of Sermons 
 Sermon 1
 Sermon 2 
 Sermon 3 
 Sermon 4 
 Sermon 5
 Sermon 6
 Sermon 7

Constitutions 

No original manuscript of the Constitutions survive, only a very early copy. The Constitutions is no more than an extended outline. It was never approved nor promulgated, hence, it was never binding. In all probability, it is a reworked translation of a previous Latin outline by Fra Battista, the so-called “Primitive Constitutions.” It was a basic text worked on by the first Fathers toward a definitive text.
 
The available text consists of 19 chapters, but a close scrutiny points to several layers of composition. There is a conclusion at the end of Chapter 16; another one at the end of Chapter 18; and a third one at the end of Chapter 19. This is evidence that the text went through several writings and underwent multiple reworking.

A letter of Father Nicolò D’Aviano, dated October 10, 1570 (even as the definitive Constitutions of 1579 were being redacted), informs us that three chapters of the Constitutions were undoubtedly written by Anthony Mary himself. They are Chapter 12: “Formation of Novices”; Chapter 17: “Signs of Deteriorating 17 Religious Life”; and Chapter 19: “Qualities of a Reformer.” In addition, Anthony Mary's hand can be recognized, more or less, throughout the entire document.
 
The Constitutions is a document of laws, hence its classification in the juridical literary genre. However, in Anthony Mary's additions, the peremptory style turns exhortatory. This change of style helps locate Anthony Mary's interpolations in the original text of Battista da Crema.

References

Text of the 1579 Constitutions 
 *CONSTITUTIONS

Bibliography
Marcello Landi, La presenza della Summa Theologiae di Tommaso d'Aquino nei primi due Sermoni di Antonio Maria Zaccaria in Barnabiti Studi 20 (2003), pp. 69–81
  Marcello Landi, Sant'Antonio Maria Zaccaria. Contesto storico-culturale e presenza della Summa Theologiae di san Tommaso d'Aquino nei suoi primi tre sermoni, in Sacra Doctrina. Studi e ricerche n. 52 (3/2006), pp. 46–81
Fr. Franco Maria Chilardotti, CRSP, 2009 Antonio Maia Zaccaria 1502-1539 : Una meteora del ciquecento nella scia di Paolo Apostolo.

External links
Barnabite Spiritual Center - Bethlehem, PA: Spirituality of St. Anthony Mary Zaccaria
St. Anthony Mary's biography and his writings page on the Barnabite Fathers' North American website
Founder Statue in St Peter's Basilica

16th-century Christian saints
1502 births
1539 deaths
University of Pavia alumni
University of Padua alumni
Clergy from Cremona
Founders of Catholic religious communities
Members of the Barnabite Order
Italian Roman Catholic saints
Incorrupt saints
Barnabite saints
Canonizations by Pope Leo XIII
16th-century Italian physicians
Beatifications by Pope Leo XIII